Hiroo may refer to:

 Hiroo (given name), a masculine Japanese given name
 Hiroo, Shibuya, Tokyo, a neighborhood in the Shibuya district of Tokyo
 Hiroo Station, a subway station in Tokyo.
 Hiroo, Hokkaidō, a town in the Tokachi subprefecture of Hokkaidō
 Hiroo District, Hokkaidō, a district in Tokachi Subprefecture of Hokkaidō
 Mount Hiroo, a mountain in the Hidaka Mountains of Hokkaidō

See also
 Hiro (disambiguation)